Erica Scarff (born 16 August 1996) is a Canadian paracanoeist who competes in international level events.

She was a former national gymnast before she was diagnosed with osteosarcoma aged twelve after she broke her right leg when she ran into a vault in her gymnastics training session, her leg was amputated soon after the accident. Scarff was a very active person before her diagnosis: she tried swimming, cycling and alpine skiing but chose canoeing. Since her diagnosis, she was inspired by Terry Fox who also has the same cancer as she does.

References

External links
 
 

1996 births
Living people
Paracanoeists of Canada
Canadian female canoeists
Paracanoeists at the 2016 Summer Paralympics